Bardeh Rashan (also Romanized as Bardeh Rashān) is a village in Mokriyan-e Sharqi Rural District, in the Central District of Mahabad County, West Azerbaijan Province, Iran. At the 2006 census, its population was 579, in 102 families.

References 

Populated places in Mahabad County